17 RE (17 Kings) is the second full-length studio album from Italian rock band Litfiba and the second part of the "Trilogy of power", as begun with the debut, Desaparecido.

Track listing
All songs written and arranged by Litfiba.

Personnel
Piero Pelù – Vocals
Ghigo Renzulli – Guitars
Ringo de Palma – Drums
Antonio Aiazzi – Keyboards
Gianni Maroccolo – Bass
Francesco Magnelli – Piano

Litfiba albums
1986 albums
Italian-language albums
Compagnia Generale del Disco albums